Alone in the Dark is a 1982 American slasher film co-written and directed by Jack Sholder in his directorial debut, and starring Jack Palance, Martin Landau, Donald Pleasence, Dwight Schultz, and Erland Van Lidth. The plot tells about a psychiatrist's family who are besieged by four escaped mental patients during a power blackout. Following Stunts and Polyester, it was one of the first films produced by New Line Cinema.

Plot
Psychiatrist Dan Potter is appointed on the staff of Dr. Leo Bain's experimental psychiatric hospital, known as the Haven, in New Jersey. His predecessor, Dr. Merton, has taken a new position in Philadelphia. Dan, his wife Nell, and their daughter Lyla, move into a rural home in the area. At Haven, Dr. Bain uses lenient security methods, except with the third-floor patients, whom he keeps contained with an electric security door. Among them are former POW Frank Hawkes, pyromaniac evangelist Byron "Preacher" Sutcliff, obese child molester Ronald Elster, and a shy serial killer John "the Bleeder" Skagg, who refuses to show his face. Angered by Dr. Merton's departure, the third-floor patients irrationally blame Dan, believing he has murdered Merton and taken his place. The four men make plans to kill Dan, and retrieve his address from Dr. Bain's office.

Dan's younger sister, Toni, who has recently suffered a nervous breakdown, arrives to visit. Dan, Nell, and Toni go to a local rock club, while Lyla is left with babysitter Bunky. A regional power outage occurs. The security system at Haven fails, and the four men on the third floor escape, killing security guard Ray in the process, before killing another doctor and stealing his car. They stop by a local strip mall that is being looted during the blackout and arm themselves with weapons from a sporting goods store. They leave Skagg behind after he kills an innocent bystander.

The next morning, Preacher arrives at the Potter residence, pretending to be delivering a telegram, but Dan is not home. While Lyla is at school, Nell accompanies Toni to a nuclear power protest, where the women are arrested. Lyla arrives home from school and finds Ronald in the house, claiming to be a babysitter. After Nell phones Dan from jail explaining what has happened, Dan calls Bunky, who goes to check on Lyla. She finds Lyla asleep in her room, and invites her boyfriend Billy there to have sex. Preacher kills Billy by dragging him beneath the bed and stabbing him, while Ronald strangles Bunky. Lyla later awakens unharmed, but Ronald has vanished. Dan arrives home with Nell, Toni, and Tom, a fellow protester Nell and Toni met in jail, whom Toni is attracted to.  They find police at the house, and Detective Barnett interviewing Lyla about the missing Bunky and Billy. Lyla explains that a man named Ronald babysat her; Dan recognizes him as one of the Haven patients.

Dan and Nell invite Detective Barnett to stay for dinner. While investigating a noise outside, Barnett is killed with a crossbow by Frank, which is witnessed by the entire family. Finding the phone lines cut, the family barricade themselves in the house. Meanwhile, Dr. Bain arrives after unsuccessfully attempting to reach Dan by phone, but is hacked to death by Preacher with an axe. Dan attempts to reason with the men, assuring them he has not killed Dr. Merton. Ronald throws Barnett's body through a window, and Preacher manages to infiltrate the basement, where he starts a fire. Dan bludgeons Preacher with an extinguisher canister before putting out the fire, locking the basement door behind him.

Ronald enters the kitchen and attempts to kill the family, but they work together to disarm him, before Tom kills him with a cleaver. Dan flees outside to retrieve Leo's car. While he does, Tom's nose begins bleeding profusely, revealing his identity as Skagg, the fourth patient. Hearing the screams, Dan flees back into the house. Skagg attempts to kill Toni, but Nell stabs him to death. Moments later, Preacher bursts out of the basement, but Dan stabs him to death. Frank appears with his crossbow, proclaiming, "It's not just us crazy ones who kill." Dan pleads with Frank to spare his family. Suddenly, the electricity is restored, and Frank witnesses Dr. Merton being interviewed on a local news station about the missing patients. Hysterical, Frank smashes the television and flees into the night.

A short time later, Frank arrives at the local rock club. A drunken woman approaches him inside. He pulls out a pistol, pointing it to her neck. Assuming he is playing a joke, the woman laughs, and so does Frank.

Cast

Production
Alone in the Dark was the first film produced by New Line Cinema, which had previously been exclusively a film distribution company. According to director Jack Sholder, he had listened to New Line founder Robert Shaye mull over the idea of getting into production of low-budget horror films, and pitched the idea of "a group of criminally insane guys escaping from a mental hospital during a blackout in NYC and creating mayhem and then getting rounded up by the mafia", citing a New York City blackout he had experienced several years prior as an inspiration. The script was considered too expensive to produce, so it was re-written as a home-invasion thriller (without the "mafia" angle). While New Line raised money for the film, Sholder worked as the editor of the 1981 slasher The Burning, which he credits with helping him learn about "building scares and how to build suspense and tension".

Sholder has said that the character of Dr. Leo Bain is based on Scottish psychiatrist R. D. Laing, who espoused a similar philosophy regarding the treatment of mentally ill patients.

Release

Alone in the Dark premiered in the United States on November 19, 1982. It was later screened at the 16th Annual Sitges Film Festival in October 1983, where Elizabeth Ward received an award for Best Actress for her work in the film.

Reception
On the review aggregator website Rotten Tomatoes, Alone in the Dark holds a 69% approval rating based on 13 critic reviews, with an average rating of 6.3/10.

Brett Gallman from Oh, the Horror gave the film a positive review, commending the film for its tense atmosphere, dark humor, and Pleasence's performance. Felix Vasquez from Cinema Crazed offered similar praise, commending its unique style, gradual building of tension, performances, and twist ending. Vasquez concluded his review by writing, "Sholder succeeds in building the sense of isolation and dread in the climax, and sure, the plot twist with our characters is completely telegraphed minutes in advance, but it's still a fantastic revelation nonetheless". Dennis Schwartz from Ozus' World Movie Reviews rated the film a grade B: "Though the plot is hokey and its message is crazy, the maniacs- on -the -loose thriller is chilling". TV Guide awarded the film a negative 2/5 stars, calling it "a cut above the average maniacs-on-the-loose entry".

Home media
Alone in the Dark was released on DVD by Image Entertainment on September 13, 2005. Image would later re-release the film on June 5, 2007, as a part of a two-disk four movie pack. It was released for the first time on Blu-ray by Shout! Factory on September 14, 2021.

See also
 Blackout - 2008 American horror film featuring a similar premise.
 List of films featuring home invasions

References

External links
 
 
 
 
 

1982 films
1982 horror films
1982 thriller films
1980s slasher films
American horror thriller films
American independent films
American serial killer films
American slasher films
1980s English-language films
Films about psychiatry
Films directed by Jack Sholder
Films set in New Jersey
Home invasions in film
New Line Cinema films
Backwoods slasher films
1982 directorial debut films
1980s American films